The following is a list of notable events and releases of the year 1885 in Norwegian music.

Events

Deaths

Births

 October
 15 – Fridtjof Backer-Grøndahl, pianist, composer and music teacher (died 1959).

 November
 14 – Trygve Torjussen, pianist and composer (died 1977).

 December
 6 – Helge Klæstad, Supreme Court judge and composer (died 1965).

See also
 1885 in Norway
 Music of Norway

References

 
Norwegian music
Norwegian
Music
1880s in Norwegian music